

Events

January– March 
 January 1 – The foundation of Fort George, Bombay is laid by Colonel Keating, principal engineer, on the site of the former Dongri Fort.
 February 1 – Thomas Jefferson's home at Shadwell, Virginia is destroyed by fire, along with most of his books. 
 February 14 – Scottish explorer James Bruce arrives at Gondar, capital of Abyssinia (now Ethiopia) and is received by the Emperor Tekle Haymanot II and Ras Mikael Sehul. 
 February 22 – Christopher Seider, an 11-year-old boy in Boston in the British Province of Massachusetts Bay, is shot and killed by a colonial official, Ebenezer Richardson.  The funeral sets off anti-British protests that lead to the massacre days later.
 March 5 – Boston Massacre: Eleven American men are shot (five fatally) by British troops, in an event that helps start the American Revolutionary War five years later.   
 March 21 – King Prithvi Narayan Shah shifts to the newly constructed Basantapur Palace in the capital Kathmandu as the first King of Unified Kingdom of Nepal 
 March 26 – First voyage of James Cook: English explorer Captain James Cook and his crew aboard  complete the circumnavigation of New Zealand.

April–June 
 April 12 – The Townshend Acts were repealed by Britain's Parliament by the efforts of Prime Minister Frederick North, with the exception of the increased duties on imported tea.  The American colonists, in turn, stopped their embargo on British imports.
 April 18 (April 19 by Cook's log) 18:00 – First voyage of James Cook: English explorer Captain James Cook and his crew become the first recorded Europeans to encounter the eastern coastline of the Australian continent. Land was sighted at Point Hicks, and named after Lieutenant Hicks who first observed landform at 6am. 
 April 20 – Battle of Aspindza: Georgian king Erekle II defeats the Ottoman forces, despite being abandoned by an ally, Russian General Totleben.
Because the young botanist on board the ship, Joseph Banks, discovers 30,000 specimens of plant life in the area, 1,600 of them unknown to European science, Cook names the place Botany Bay on May 7.
 May 7 – Fourteen-year-old Marie Antoinette arrives at the French court.
 May 16 – Marie Antoinette marries Louis-Auguste (who later becomes King Louis XVI of France).
 May 20 – A stampede, at a celebration of the newly wedded Marie Antoinette and Louis-Auguste in Paris, kills more than a hundred people.
 June 3 – 
Gaspar de Portolà and Father Junípero Serra establish Monterey, the presidio  of Alta California territory for Spain from 1777–1822, United Mexican States 1824–1846, until the California Republic.
The 7.5  Port-au-Prince earthquake affects the French colony of Saint-Domingue with a maximum Mercalli intensity of X (Extreme), killing 250 or more.
 June 9 – Falklands Crisis (1770): Some 1,600 Spanish marines, sent by the Spanish governor of Buenos Aires in five frigates, seize Port Egmont in the Falkland Islands. The small British force present promptly surrenders.
 June 11 – First voyage of James Cook:  grounds on the Great Barrier Reef.

July– September
 July 5 – Battle of Chesma and Battle of Larga: The Russian Empire defeats the Ottoman Empire in both battles. When the news of the defeat reaches the Ottoman city of Smyrna (July 8), the crowd attacks the Greek community of the city (perceived as favourable to the Russian cause) and kills an estimated 200 Greeks and three Western Europeans (although some reports estimate the number of victims at 3,000 or even 5,000 including "3 or 4 thousands who die due to the fright").
 August 1 (July 21 O.S.) – Russo-Turkish War (1768–74) – Battle of Kagul: Russian commander Pyotr Rumyantsev routs 150,000 Turks. 
 August 22 (August 23 by Cook's log) – First voyage of James Cook: Captain Cook determines that New Holland (Australia) is not contiguous with New Guinea, and claims the whole of its eastern coast for Great Britain, later naming it all New South Wales.
 c. September – Johann Gottfried Herder meets Johann Wolfgang von Goethe in Strasbourg.
 September 24 – In Hillsborough, North Carolina, the Regulator Movement riots against local authorities.

October–December 
October 11 – Phillis Wheatley becomes the first African American woman to have her work published, after having written a poetic elegy to the late Reverend George Whitefield. 
November 14 – James Bruce discovers what he believes to be the source of the Nile.
December 7 – King Louis XV of France issues the "Edict of December", dismissing the rebellious magistrates of the Parlements of Paris and the other 13 provinces.
December 24 – France's Secretary of the Navy, César Gabriel de Choiseul, is fired from his position by the king.

Date unknown 
 Joseph Priestley, British chemist, recommends the use of a rubber to remove pencil marks.
 Joseph-Louis Lagrange proves Bachet's Conjecture.
 The Baron d'Holbach's (anonymous) materialist work Le Système de la Nature ou Des Loix du Monde Physique et du Monde Moral is produced in Neuchâtel.
 The last Cuman who spoke the Cuman language dies in Hungary.

Births 
 February 21 – Georges Mouton, Marshal of France (d. 1838)
 March 2 – Louis-Gabriel Suchet, Marshal of France (d. 1826)
 March 20 – Friedrich Hölderlin, German writer (d. 1843)
 April 3 – Theodoros Kolokotronis, Greek general (d. 1843)
 April 7 – William Wordsworth, English poet (d. 1850)
 April 8 – John Campbell, Australian public servant, politician (d. 1830)
 April 11 – George Canning, Prime Minister of the United Kingdom (d. 1827)
 April 25 – Georg Sverdrup, Norwegian philologist (d. 1850)
 April 30 – David Thompson, English-Canadian explorer (d. 1857)
 May 10 – Louis-Nicolas Davout, Marshal of France (d. 1823)
 May 15 – Ezekiel Hart, Canadian entrepreneur, politician (d. 1843)
 May 27 – Ignaz Döllinger, German anatomist, physiologist (d. 1841)
 May 29 – Charles Adams, second son of President John Adams (1735–1826) (d. 1800)
 June 1 – Friedrich Laun, German author (d. 1849)

 June 3 – Manuel Belgrano, Argentine politician, general in the Independence War (d. 1820)
 June 4 – Eleonora Charlotta d'Albedyhll, Swedish countess, poet and salon holder (d. 1835)
 June 7 – Robert Jenkinson, 2nd Earl of Liverpool, Prime Minister of the United Kingdom (d. 1828)
 June 20 – Moses Waddel, American educator/minister and bestselling author (d. 1840)
 August 1 – William Clark, American explorer, Governor of Missouri Territory, and Superintendent of Indian Affairs (d. 1838)
 August 3 – King Frederick William III of Prussia (d. 1840)
 August 18 – Dorothea von Rodde-Schlözer, German scholar (d. 1825) 

 August 27 – Georg Wilhelm Friedrich Hegel, German philosopher (d. 1831)
 October 10 – Adam Johann von Krusenstern, Baltic German explorer who led the First Russian circumnavigation (d. 1846)
 October 18 – Thomas Phillips, English painter (d. 1845) 
 November 5 – Sarah Guppy, English inventor (d. 1852)
 November 19 – Bertel Thorvaldsen, Danish-Icelandic sculptor (d. 1844) 

 December 17 (bapt.) – Ludwig van Beethoven, German classical composer (d. 1827)
 December 18 – Nicolas Joseph Maison, Marshal of France, Minister of War (d. 1840)

Deaths 
 January 7 – Carl Gustaf Tessin, Swedish politician (b. 1695)
 January 8 – John Michael Rysbrack, Flemish sculptor (b. 1694)
 January 20 – Charles Yorke, Lord Chancellor of Great Britain (b. 1722)
 January 27 – Johann Karl Philipp von Cobenzl, 18th-century politician (b. 1712)
 January 30 – Giovanni Pietro Francesco Agius de Soldanis, Maltese linguist, historian and cleric (b. 1712)
 January 27 – Philippe Macquer, French historian (b. 1720)
 February 26 – Giuseppe Tartini, Italian composer, violinist (b. 1692)
 March 5 – Crispus Attucks, African-American dockworker, first to die in the Boston Massacre (b. 1723)

 March 27 – Giovanni Battista Tiepolo, Venetian artist (b. 1696)
 April 27 – José Solís Folch de Cardona, Spanish colonial governor (b. 1716)
 April 25 – Jean-Antoine Nollet, French abbot, physicist (b. 1700)
 May 30 – François Boucher, French painter (b. 1703)
 June 22 – Philip Carteret Webb, English barrister (b. 1702)
 June 23 – Mark Akenside, English poet, physician (b. 1721)
 July 17 – Joseph Paris Duverney, French banker (b. 1684)
 July 21 – Charlotta Frölich, Swedish agronomist (b. 1698)  
 July 27 – Robert Dinwiddie, British colonial Governor of Virginia (b. 1693)
 August 15 – Edward Antill (colonial politician), American winemaker (b. 1701)
 August 24 – Thomas Chatterton, English poet (b. 1752)
 September 2 – Hongzhou, Manchu prince of the Qing Dynasty (b. 1712)
 September 9 – Bernhard Siegfried Albinus, German anatomist (b. 1697)
 September 22 – Ignatius of Santhià, Italian Catholic priest (b. 1686)

 September 30
 George Whitefield, English-born Methodist leader (b. 1714)
 Thomas Robinson, 1st Baron Grantham, English politician and diplomat
 October 14 – Benning Wentworth, colonial governor of New Hampshire (b. 1696)
 October 18 – John Manners, Marquess of Granby, British soldier (b. 1721)
 November 9 – John Campbell, 4th Duke of Argyll, Scottish politician
 November 13 – George Grenville, Prime Minister of Great Britain (b. 1712)
 November 24 – Charles-Jean-François Hénault, French historian (b. 1685)
 December 4 – John Perceval, 2nd Earl of Egmont, Irish politician (b. 1711)
 December 5 – James Stirling, Scottish mathematician (b. 1692)
 December 6 – Neri Maria Corsini, Italian Catholic priest and cardinal (b. 1685)

References

Further reading